Tischeria gouaniae is a moth of the family Tischeriidae. It is known from Belize.

The wingspan is 5-5.2 mm.

The larvae feed on Gouania polygama. They mine the leaves of their host plant. The mine has the form of a linear mine.

Etymology
The species name refers to the host-plant genus (Gouania).

References

Tischeriidae
Moths described in 2007